Hiaspis is a genus of moths of the family Erebidae.

Species
Some species of this genus are:
Hiaspis apicalis (Swinhoe, 1904) (Borneo)
Hiaspis closteroides  Walker, 1866 (Borneo & West-Malaysia)
Hiaspis fuscobrunnea  (Hampson, 1895) (Bhutan & Ceylon)

References

Hypeninae
Moth genera